Udhowal is a village in Nakodar in Jalandhar district of Punjab State, India. The village is administrated by a sarpanch who is an elected representative of village as per Panchayati raj (India).

School/Education

Udhowal has most beautiful school in whole Bet area.

Initially it was a primary school later it was upgraded to middle, high and finally Senior Secondary School in 1991. With the continuous effort of local villagers and tremendous support of NRIs  most of the school building is constructed by villagates. At one point of time there were students coming from 50+ surrounding villages. Students of this school serving the communities worldwide as amazing citizens as doctors, engineers, teachers, managers, farmers, homemakers, businessmen, and so on.

Demography 
As of 2011, The village has a total number of 254 houses and population of 1339 of which include 671 are males while 668 are females according to the report published by Census India in 2011. Literacy rate of the village is 78.75%, higher than state average of 75.84%. The population of children under the age of 6 years is 125 which is 9.34% of total population of the village, and child sex ratio is approximately 1272 higher than the state average of 846.

Most of the people are from Schedule Caste which constitutes 43.76% of total population in the village. The town does not have any Schedule Tribe population so far.

As per census 2011, 398 people were engaged in work activities out of the total population of the village which includes 358 males and 40 females. According to census survey report 2011, 77.39% workers describe their work as main work and 22.61% workers are involved in marginal activity providing livelihood for less than 6 months.

Transport 
Nakodar railway station is the nearest train station.

References 

Villages in Jalandhar district
Villages in Nakodar tehsil